Alexandru Savin (born 12 February 1995) is a Romanian rugby union football player. He plays as a prop for professional SuperLiga club CSM București.

Club career
Alexandru Savin played for SuperLiga club, CSM București, for the 2016–17, 2017–18 and 2018–19 seasons.

International career
In November 2018, Savin was called for Romania's national team, the Oaks, being part of the 34 man squad assembled in preparation for a match against the Os Lobos held for the Relegation/Promotion Play-Off of the 2018 Rugby Europe Championship.

He is the 648 Oak ever selected in the Romanian XV National Team.

References

External links

1995 births
Living people
Romanian rugby union players
CSM București (rugby union) players
Rugby union props
People from Focșani
Romania international rugby union players